Richard Glover is an Australian talk radio presenter, journalist and author. He is best known as presenter of the drive program on 702 ABC Sydney. His book Flesh Wounds was voted one of the top five books of 2015 by viewers of ABC television's The Book Club and was Readers Choice Award winner as Biography of the Year in the 2016 Australian Book Industry Awards.

Life and career

Glover was born in Australia but spent some of his early life in Papua New Guinea. He graduated from the University of Sydney with a Bachelor of Arts degree with first class honours. He has written 13 books, including the humour book Desperate Husbands, which was a best-seller in Australia and has been published in translation in Italy and Poland.

Glover presents the radio show Drive from Monday to Friday, 3pm to 6.30 pm on 702 ABC Sydney. He joined 702 ABC Sydney in January 1996, taking over the Drive segment from Mike Carlton. In 2004 he was awarded the Broadcaster of the Year Award for ABC local radio.

Glover's writing for the stage includes Lonestar Lemon, which has toured nationally with Genevieve Lemon, and A Christmas Story, which premiered at the Sydney Opera House Drama Theatre in December 1998, with Richard Wherrett directing.

Glover is also a newspaper journalist. His weekly humour column has appeared in The Sydney Morning Herald since 1985. He has also worked as that paper's news editor, arts editor and European correspondent. He also writes for The Washington Post.

In December 2011 Glover and Peter Fitzsimons achieved a record for the world's longest radio interview, supervised by Guinness World Records.

Political views

Glover is an atheist, and says he "never managed a speck of interest in religion" but believes Christianity and religion should be tolerated by non-believers. In 2015 he wrote that "Marketplace economics is now the God of our time, and its priests are Microsoft, Apple and Google". Glover supports same-sex marriage in Australia, which he says will be "entirely positive".

Books
 (1990) Grin and bear it: a survivor's guide to marriage, kids, family holidays, home renovations, the English and other horrors
 (1992) The P-plate parent (with Angela Webber)
 (1993) Laughing stock: one man's battle with sex, work and a son called Batboy
 (1994) (with Angela Webber)The joy of blokes: a survivor's guide to the men in your life, how to meet them, how to love them, how to eat their cooking
 (1998) Maps, dreams, history: race and representation in Aboriginal Australia
 (2000) In bed with Jocasta
 (2004) The dag's dictionary: a humorous book of words that should exist, but don't
 (2005) Desperate husbands
 (2009) The mud house: four friends, one block of land, no power tools
 (2010) Why men are necessary and other news from nowhere 
 (2013) George Clooney's haircut and other cries for help 
 (2015) Flesh wounds 
 (2018) Land before avocado: journeys in a lost Australia
 (2020) Love, Clancy: a dog's letters home

Children's Books
 (2003) The dirt experiment
 (2007) The joke trap (
 (2011) The no-minute noodler: dag's dictionary for kids (e-book) (

References

External links
 Sydney Morning Herald column
 ABC 702 Drive program
 ABC profile
 A Cure for Saggy Breast? – Glover's contribution to an A Current Affair story. (Video link available)
 Official Website

Australian radio personalities
Radio in Sydney
Living people
1958 births
Meanjin people
People educated at Canberra Grammar School